Events in the year 2020 in Eritrea.

Incumbents 

 President: Isaias Afewerki

Events 
Ongoing – COVID-19 pandemic in Eritrea

 March 21 –The first case of COVID-19 in the country was confirmed in Asmara; the index case was an Eritrean national arriving from Norway.
November 15 – Diplomats say that rockets fired from Tigray Region, Ethiopia, landed near the airport in Asmara.
December 4 – Twenty-eight Jehovah's Witnesses are released after being imprisoned for five 26 years. Twenty-four other members of the sect remain in prison.

Deaths
May 13 – Afwerki Abraha, chemist, freedom fighter, diplomat; died of COVID-19 in the UK (b. 1949)

References 

 
2020s in Eritrea
Years of the 21st century in Eritrea
Eritrea 
Eritrea